Yellowhead Bridge can refer to one of two bridges in the British Columbia Interior.

Yellowhead Bridge (Prince George), which carries British Columbia Highway 16 over the Fraser River
Yellowhead Bridge (Kamloops), which carries British Columbia Highway 5 over the South Thompson River